Iago Sampaio Silva, known as Iago (born 21 May 1995) is a Brazilian football player who plays for Patrocinense.

Club career
He made his Campeonato Brasileiro Série A debut for Grêmio on 24 July 2016 in a game against São Paulo.

On 5 January 2018, he signed with the Russian club FC Baltika Kaliningrad on a year-long loan.

References

External links
 

1995 births
Living people
Footballers from Rio de Janeiro (city)
Brazilian footballers
Brazilian expatriate footballers
Fluminense FC players
Grêmio Foot-Ball Porto Alegrense players
Figueirense FC players
FC Baltika Kaliningrad players
Criciúma Esporte Clube players
Veranópolis Esporte Clube Recreativo e Cultural players
Clube Atlético Patrocinense players
Campeonato Brasileiro Série A players
Campeonato Brasileiro Série B players
Association football midfielders
Brazilian expatriate sportspeople in Russia
Expatriate footballers in Russia